The year 1816 in archaeology involved some significant events.

Explorations

Excavations
 March - The stupa at Amaravathi village, Guntur district, is recorded and excavated by Colin Mackenzie.
 The North Leigh Roman Villa, in Oxfordshire is extensively excavated between 1813 and 1816, when its plan is recovered and interior features are reported.
 Giovanni Battista Caviglia begins work at Giza Necropolis.

Finds

Events
 Christian Jürgensen Thomsen is appointed curator of the collections of the Museum of Northern Antiquities in Copenhagen, where he begins to organize them according to the three-age system.
 The Elgin Marbles are purchased by the British government from Thomas Bruce, 7th Earl of Elgin, for the British Museum in London.

Publications

Births

 September 16 - Charles Thomas Newton, English Classical archaeologist (d. 1894).
 November 24 - Llewellynn Jewitt, British archaeologist, illustrator and natural scientist (d. 1886).

Deaths

References

Archaeology
Archaeology by year
Archaeology
Archaeology